Armin Weiss (or Weiß in German script) (5 November 1927 – 7 December 2010) was a German inorganic chemist and politician of the Green Party.

Life
Weiss was born and raised in Stefling (near Nittenau), not far from Wackersdorf, where during the 1980s, the West German nuclear industry began building the nuclear reprocessing plant Wackersdorf. Upset by this move, Weiss took leave from his position as Professor of Inorganic Chemistry at Ludwig Maximilians University in Munich, and began making public appearances in opposition to the plant.  Eventually the construction of Wackersdorf was stopped. Later, as a member of the Bavarian state government, he continued to oppose nuclear plants.  In 2007, Professor Weiss received the  Nuclear-Free Future Lifetime Achievement Award.

Work
The intercalation in clay minerals was major research interest during the start of his academic career. Urea has been used as compound for the production of high quality china for a long time but the mechanism of action was first described by Weiss in 1961.

See also
Anti-nuclear movement in Germany

References

1927 births
2010 deaths
German anti–nuclear power activists
20th-century German chemists
Politicians from Bavaria
University of Regensburg alumni
University of Würzburg alumni
Technische Universität Darmstadt alumni
Academic staff of the Ludwig Maximilian University of Munich
Academic staff of Heidelberg University
People from Schwandorf (district)